This is a list of South Korean films released in 2005.

Box office
The highest-grossing South Korean films released in 2005, by domestic box office gross revenue, are as follows:

A-I

J-Z

See also
 List of Korean-language films
 List of South Korean actresses
 List of South Korean male actors
 2005 in South Korea
 2005 in South Korean music

References

External links 

 Korean Film Council website

2005
2005 in South Korean cinema
South Korean